Panasonic Lumix DMC-FX90 is a digital camera by Panasonic Lumix. The highest-resolution pictures it records is 12.1 megapixels, through its 25 mm Leica DC VARIO-SUMMARIT.

Property
12.1 MP CCD
Wi-Fi® connectivity
LEICA DC VARIO-SUMMARIT 2.5 Ultra Wide Angle 25 mm Lens with Mega O.I.S.
5x zoom
1080/60i HD Movie

References

External links

DMC-FX90K on shop.panasonic.com
Panasonic Lumix DMC-FX90 Review: Connected and Capable

Bridge digital cameras
FX90